Woodmere is a village in Cuyahoga County and an eastern suburb of the Greater Cleveland  area in the US state of Ohio. As of the 2010 census, Woodmere had a population of 884 residents. The village is bounded on the north by the city of Pepper Pike, on the west by the city of Beachwood, and on the south and east by the village of Orange.

History
Woodmere is one of the five municipalities, along with Hunting Valley, Moreland Hills, Orange Village and Pepper Pike, that originally formed Orange Township, the birthplace of President James A. Garfield. While the other four municipalities were established in the 1920s, Woodmere was incorporated as a village in 1944. Today, centered along Chagrin Boulevard, Woodmere serves as the primary commercial district for all parts of the original Orange Township.

Geography
Woodmere is located at  (41.459253, -81.481010).

Demographics

2010 census
As of the census of 2010, there were 884 people, 446 households, and 225 families living in the village. The racial makeup of the village was 60.5% White, 35.9% African American, 3.7% Asian, 1.0% from other races, and 3.8% from two or more races. Hispanic or Latino of any race were 3.7% of the population.

There were 446 households, of which 28.7% had children under the age of 18 living with them, 26.0% were married couples living together, 20.6% had a female householder with no husband present, 3.8% had a male householder with no wife present, and 49.6% were non-families. 46.2% of all households were made up of individuals, and 8.5% had someone living alone who was 65 years of age or older. The average household size was 1.98 and the average family size was 2.84.

The median age in the village was 37.9 years. 23.5% of residents were under the age of 18; 9.4% were between the ages of 18 and 24; 26.8% were from 25 to 44; 29.5% were from 45 to 64; and 11% were 65 years of age or older. The gender makeup of the village was 41.9% male and 58.1% female.

2000 census
As of the census of 2000, there were 828 people, 424 households, and 186 families living in the village. The population density was 2,515.6 people per square mile (968.8/km). There were 460 housing units at an average density of 1,397.6 per square mile (538.2/km). The racial makeup of the village was 39.73% White, 49.64% African American, 0.12% Native American, 7.73% Asian, 0.36% from other races, and 2.42% from two or more races. Hispanic or Latino of any race were 0.85% of the population.

There were 424 households, out of which 22.9% had children under the age of 18 living with them, 27.6% were married couples living together, 12.0% had a female householder with no husband present, and 56.1% were non-families. 48.1% of all households were made up of individuals, and 8.5% had someone living alone who was 65 years of age or older. The average household size was 1.95 and the average family size was 2.91.

In the village, the population was spread out, with 21.4% under the age of 18, 12.1% from 18 to 24, 34.9% from 25 to 44, 19.4% from 45 to 64, and 12.2% who were 65 years of age or older. The median age was 34 years. For every 100 females there were 100.5 males. For every 100 females age 18 and over, there were 96.1 males.

The median income for a household in the village was $32,102, and the median income for a family was $46,250. Males had a median income of $31,364 versus $28,214 for females. The per capita income for the village was $22,703. About 10.8% of families and 10.7% of the population were below the poverty line, including 13.1% of those under age 18 and 9.1% of those age 65 or over.

Schools
Woodmere is served by the Orange City School System.

Business
The village is home to Eton Chagrin Boulevard, an upscale shopping center featuring national retailers such as Tiffany & Co., Apple, Brooks Brothers, Anthropologie, Kendra Scott, Orvis, lululemon, Allen Edmonds, Free People, and The North Face.

Woodmere is also home to a dining scene including restaurants such as Mabel's BBQ by Michael Symon, Paladar Rum Bar + Latin Kitchen, The Original Pancake House, Taza Lebanese Grill, Mitchell's Fish Market, and Texas de Brazil.

References

External links
 Village website

Villages in Cuyahoga County, Ohio
Villages in Ohio
1944 establishments in Ohio
Populated places established in 1944